The Republican Party of India (Democratic) was a political party in India. The leader and party president of the party was T. M. Kamble. After T. M. Kamble's death, Nanda T. Kamble became the president of the party.

The party was a splinter group of the Republican Party of India. After the 2004 election, it had minor representation within the Lok Sabha and was a constituent of the ruling United Progressive Alliance. Its presence was limited to Maharashtra.

On 5 May 2011, the RP(D) aligned itself with the BJP-led NDA. In 2015, it was listed as one of the 26 political allies for prime minister candidate- Narendra Modi.

On 28 September 2015, the RP(D) was one of 16 parties in Maharashtra to be de-registered for not submitting audited balance sheets and IT return documents going back to 2005. Thus, they lost their official election symbols.

References

Defunct political parties in Maharashtra
Republican Party of India
Political parties in Maharashtra
Dalit politics
Ambedkarite political parties
Political parties with year of establishment missing